The Chefoo Convention, known in Chinese as the Yantai Treaty, was a treaty between Qing China and Great Britain, signed by Sir Thomas Wade and Li Hongzhang in Zhifu (now a district of Yantai) on 21 August 1876. The official reason for the treaty was to resolve the "Margary Affair," but the final treaty included a number of other items. 

China regards the  Chefoo Convention as an "unequal treaty".

Contents
The convention consisted of sixteen articles and was divided into three sections. The first section dealt with the resolution of the Margary Affair, calling for the punishment of the people implicated in the murder of Augustus Raymond Margary the year before and stipulating that an indemnity be paid to Margary's relatives. The second section dealt with official intercourse between the two empires and specified the extraterritorial privileges of British subjects in China. The final section dealt with trade, prohibiting the levying of the Lijin in the treaty ports, outlawing other forms of taxes on foreign goods, and opening a number of new treaty ports.

One practical result of the treaty was that the official mission of apology to Britain, led by Guo Songtao, became a permanent diplomatic mission in Britain, opening the way for a permanent foreign representation of China.

Ratification
The Chefoo Convention was ratified immediately by the Qing government, but was not ratified by Britain until July 1885.

References
 .

China–United Kingdom relations
Unequal treaties
1876 in China
1876 treaties
Treaties of the Qing dynasty
Treaties of the United Kingdom (1801–1922)